Treatia is a genus of mites in the family Otopheidomenidae. There is at least one described species in Treatia, T. indica, found in India.

References

Rhodacaridae
Articles created by Qbugbot